is a 3D platform game developed by Japanese studio XING Interactive and published by THQ for the PlayStation.

Gameplay
Floating Runner: Quest for the 7 Crystals is a game in which the player is either a boy named Lay or a girl gamed Cress, and shooting or stomping on enemies in a 3D environment.

Reception

Floating Runner was released in the United States in the fourth quarter of 1996.

Joseph Mooney of Game on! USA declared Floating Runner "a good 3D platform game" noting good level design, ran at a good frame rate without slowing down and praising the soundtrack as "for the most part fantastic."
Mooney critiqued the lack of boss battles and that the players only given two camera angles through the game which were both "too vertical which makes it much more difficult to see what's ahead of you and know where you are."

Next Generation reviewed the PlayStation version of the game, rating it two stars out of five, and stated that "the game's light-hearted tone could appeal to younger gamers, but the difficulty of the later levels really prevents it from working as a children's game. Overall, Floating Runner is just like Super Mario 64 or Jumping Flash with the fun and detail removed." Nick Woods of Allgame gave Floating Runner a two out of five star rating noting that "A shaky mass of perspective problems, repetitive gameplay, poor translation of the story, and a lack of entertainment plague this otherwise promising title." Steve McNally of PSX-Pro gave the game a four and a half rating out of a possible ten, describing it as "the worst PSX game I've played to date (although another Japanese import, Robo Pit, is looking like it could easily surpass it in the rubbishness stakes." The reviewer compared it unfavorable to Jumping Flash and Super Mario 64 stating it was "nowhere near as good as either of those."

Reviews
Gamefan #40 (Vol 4, Issue 4) 1996 April

Notes

References

Sources
 
 
 

1996 video games
3D platform games
PlayStation (console) games
PlayStation (console)-only games
Video games developed in Japan